Comitanassus was a town of ancient Lycaonia, inhabited in Byzantine times. It appears in the Tabula Peutingeriana, under the name Comitanasso, and is located 20 M.P. from Perta.

Its site is located near Ortakuyu, Eskil, Aksaray Province, Turkey.

References

Populated places in ancient Lycaonia
Former populated places in Turkey
Populated places of the Byzantine Empire
History of Aksaray Province